Dags is a 1998 Australian comedy film centring on the adventures of a group of friends, directed, produced and written by Murray Fahey.

Production
Fahey wrote the film in three weeks. It was shot in nine and a half days using a house that acted as four locations in one.

References

External links

Dags at Oz Movies
Dags at Urban Cinefile
Dags review at SBS Movie Show

Australian comedy films
1998 films
Films directed by Murray Fahey
1990s English-language films
1990s Australian films